Ulmu may refer to several places:

 Ulmu, Ialoveni, a commune in Ialoveni district, Moldova
 Ulmu, Brăila, a commune in Brăila County, Romania
 Ulmu, Călărași, a commune in Călărași County, Romania
 Ulmu, Transnistria, a commune in Transnistria, Moldova